William Wilson (13 November 1844  – 1 June 1912) was a late 19th-century British journalist, swimming instructor and coach, contributor to the scientific techniques behind competitive swimming, and originator of the game of water polo. In 1883, Wilson published "The Swimming Instructor," one of the first books on swimming to define modern concepts of stroke efficiency, training, racing turns and water safety.

Contributions to swimming
Described and illustrated the racing start and turn.
Improved the mechanics of several strokes.
Developed the first life-saving drill.
Pioneered training methods, both dry-land and in the water, including tapering.
First newspaper journalist for the sport of swimming.
Innovator in indoor swimming pool design.

Water polo
In 1877, Wilson drew up a set of rules for a team water ball game, which he called "aquatic football". The first game took place between the banks of the River Dee at the Bon Accord Festival in Aberdeen, Scotland. Flags were placed eight or ten feet apart on the shore and players used a soft ball of Indian rubber, called a pulu. The game was a wrestling match from end to end of the field of play, but was popular with the spectators of the aquatic festivals of the era. Wilson had developed the sport while Baths Master at the Arlington Baths Club in Glasgow.

In 1885, the Swimming Association of Great Britain, recognized the game, now called water polo, and formulated a set of rules expanding on Wilson's rulebook. These eventually became the basis of FINA international rules, as the sport spread to Europe, America and Australia.

Lifesaving
In 1891, Wilson published a number of illustrated newspaper articles on lifesaving drills, and awarded prizes to local swimming clubs for proficiency in lifesaving techniques. Wilson's methods circulated in the form of a handbook, and in recognition of his contribution, he was elected the first Life Governor of the Royal Lifesaving Society.

References

External links
 
Profile of William Wilson's Contributions to Swimming Techniques, by Cecil Colwin (1999)

1844 births
1912 deaths
British male journalists
Sports inventors and innovators
Water polo people from the United Kingdom
History of water polo
English swimming coaches